Lomi salmon (more commonly known as lomilomi salmon) is a side dish in Hawaiian cuisine. It is a fresh tomato and salmon salad and was introduced to Hawaiians by early Western sailors. It is typically prepared by mixing salted, shredded salmon with tomatoes, sweet Maui onions, and occasionally scallions, and sometimes crushed ice if it is not refrigerated. It is always served cold. 
 
The name lomilomi salmon is taken from the method of preparation. The shredding (dicing) and mixing of the salmon is done by massaging the salted fish with other ingredients by hand (lomilomi is Hawaiian for "to massage").

Lomilomi salmon is a traditional side dish served at Hawaiian lū‘aus. It is said to complement traditional Hawaiian food consisting of raw diced ahi tuna, poke, kalua pig, laulau, and poi. Lomilomi salmon is a classic and integral part of most Hawaiian parties and gatherings, such as traditional luaus, and can be considered a Hawaiian ethnic food.

See also

 List of fish dishes
 Poke (salad)

References

Salmon dishes
Hawaiian cuisine
Uncooked fish dishes
Seafood dishes
Raw fish salads